Wakanim SAS was a French subscription video on-demand over-the-top streaming service owned by U.S.-based Funimation, a joint venture of Sony Corporation of America's two subsidiaries: Sony Pictures Television and Sony Music Entertainment Japan (through Aniplex).

The service was specialized in the online streaming and simulcasting of Japanese anime series. It was also the first company to offer videos for download without digital rights management on anime series in Europe.

History
Wakanim was founded on 27 February 2009 after YouTube appeared in France in 2007, and broadcast its first series in October 2010, The World God Only Knows. The aim was to launch simultaneous broadcasting (simulcast) of animated series with Japan, as the French market of the Japanese animation did not yet have an adapted legal offer and that it suffered from piracy (fansub).

In October 2013, Wakanim began expanding overseas, with the service extended to the United Kingdom in partnership with British distributor Anime Limited. Wakanim UK was later discontinued in 2014, with Space Dandy being the final title simulcasted in the region.

In July 2014, Wakanim announced a new service called Wakanim Music which is about Asian music news and would offer music streaming. It was launched in February 2015 but the service is no longer available.

In March 2015, Aniplex became the company's main shareholder, allowing for Aniplex to enter the French market, and strengthen its European presence. From 2017, Wakanim began expanding internationally. In June 2017, Wakanim established an English-subtitled version for the Nordic countries. In September 2017, Wakanim announced that it would be available for the German-speaking regions with subtitles and dubs in cooperation with the AkibaPass service. In January 2018, Wakanim further expanded by launching a Russian service for Russian-speaking countries and regions. In April 2020, Wakanim expanded its English language service to the Netherlands, with select titles from Wakanim Nordic's catalogue being made available.

In October 2016, Wakanim offered their first simultaneous French dub with Drifters, in partnership with the French television channel J-One.

On 24 September 2019, Aniplex and Sony Pictures Television announced that they were consolidating their international anime streaming businesses, with a new joint venture, Funimation Global Group, LLC., with Funimation general manager Colin Decker leading the joint venture. The joint venture would operate under Funimation's branding, and allow Funimation to acquire and distribute titles with Aniplex subsidiaries Wakanim, Madman Anime Group and AnimeLab. The first title under the joint venture, Fate/Grand Order - Absolute Demonic Front: Babylonia, would receive a 30-day exclusivity on FunimationNow, AnimeLab and Wakanim, and provide Funimation exclusive rights to the English dub for one year. Following the merger, Wakanim began offering Funimation SimulDubs in its English language service.

On 1 March 2022, it was announced that Wakanim, alongside VRV's and Funimation's SVOD service, would be consolidated into Crunchyroll.

On 11 March 2022, Crunchyroll and Wakanim announced that they would suspend their services in Russia due to the 2022 Russian invasion of Ukraine.

Features
The videos are DRM protected which the playback takes place via a proprietary HTML5 player called JW-Player version 8.11.8 (as of February 2020). In June 2015, they announced a revamp version of their website which in October they started to use the new HTML 5 player instead of Flash. Wakanim also have apps for Xbox One, PlayStation 4, Windows 10, Apple TV, Amazon Fire TV, iOS and Android platforms. The iOS and Android versions have an offline mode, in which it is possible to download videos and watch them later without internet access.

Availability

Subscription 
When Wakanim's service was launched, the accessible episodes of series were broadcast in simulcast with Japan on the Internet, in paid mode (by streaming or download without DRM) and at the same time free of charge for seven days (streaming or download with DRM) after the first broadcast. In March 2016, Wakanim offered access to its catalog with a monthly subscription.

In June 2017, they changed the way their different offers work. The episodes of the new series are broadcast in simulcast with Japan and are reserved for accounts with a subscription, called "VIP members", during the week following their broadcast. The episodes are offered with the best possible quality (up to 4K) and without ads, and after a week, free members can access it with SD quality (480p) and some ads. The old series are available for everyone but with a quality that varies according to the type of account, up to 4K and without ads for VIP members and in SD (480p) with ads for free members.

In September 2018, they started to offer three-monthly and annually subscription.

Area served
Wakanim offers series and films which are geographically restricted according to the selected language:

 Wakanim France, in French, is available in France and its overseas departments and territories, Belgium, Italy, Luxembourg, Spain, Switzerland, Tunisia, Morocco, Algeria and in Canada (Quebec).
 Wakanim Nordic, in English, is available in Sweden, Norway, Iceland, Finland, the Netherlands and Denmark.
 Wakanim DE, in German, is available in Germany, Switzerland and Austria.
 Wakanim RU, in Russian, is available in Albania, Armenia, Azerbaijan, Belarus, Bosnia and Herzegovina, Bulgaria, Croatia, Cyprus, Czech Republic, Kazakhstan, Georgia, Hungary, Latvia, Lithuania, Macedonia, Moldova, Poland, Romania, Russia, San Marino, Serbia, Slovakia, Slovenia and Ukraine.

References

External links
  
 
 

2022 disestablishments in France
Anime companies
Aniplex
Companies based in Hauts-de-France
Defunct video on demand services
Defunct subscription services
Entertainment companies of France
Entertainment companies established in 2009
Entertainment companies disestablished in 2022
French companies established in 2009
Internet properties established in 2009
Internet properties disestablished in 2022
Subscription video on demand services